The 2015–16 Murray State Racers men's basketball team represented Murray State University during the 2015–16 NCAA Division I men's basketball season. The Racers, led by first year head coach Matt McMahon, played their home games at the CFSB Center and were members of the West Division of the Ohio Valley Conference. They finished the season 17–14, 10–6 in OVC play to finish in a tie for the West Division title. They defeated Eastern Illinois in the first round of the OVC tournament to advance to the quarterfinals where they lost to Morehead State.

Roster

Schedule

|-
!colspan=9 style="background:#000033; color:#ECAC00;"| Exhibition

|-
!colspan=9 style="background:#000033; color:#ECAC00;"| Non-conference regular season

|-
!colspan=9 style="background:#000033; color:#ECAC00;"| Ohio Valley Conference regular season

|-
!colspan=9 style="background:#000033; color:#ECAC00;"|Ohio Valley Conference tournament

References

Murray State Racers men's basketball seasons
Murray State